Vice Admiral Charles Thomas Curme (2 August 1827 – 19 February 1892) was a Royal Navy officer who went on to be Commander-in-Chief, The Nore.

Naval career
Curme joined the Royal Navy in 1841. Promoted to Captain in 1864, he commanded HMS Repulse, HMS Duncan and then HMS Indus. He was made Admiral Superintendent of Devonport dockyard in 1880 and in that role opposed the appointment of civil assistants in dockyards believing dockyards should be run by naval officers. He became Commander-in-Chief, The Nore in 1890 and died in office two years later.

References

1827 births
1892 deaths
Royal Navy vice admirals